The Cessna 310 is an American four-to-six-seat, low-wing, twin-engine monoplane produced by Cessna between 1954 and 1980. It was the first twin-engine aircraft that Cessna put into production after World War II.

Development
The 310 first flew on January 3, 1953, with deliveries starting in late 1954. The sleek modern lines of the new twin were backed up by innovative features such as engine exhaust thrust augmenter tubes and the storage of all fuel in tip tanks in early models. In 1964, the engine exhaust was changed to flow under the wing instead of the augmenter tubes, which were considered to be noisy.

Typical of Cessna model naming conventions, a letter was added after the model number to identify changes to the original design over the years. The first significant upgrade to the 310 series was the 310C in 1959, which introduced more powerful  Continental IO-470-D engines. In 1960 the 310D featured swept-back vertical tail surfaces. An extra cabin window was added with the 310F.

The turbocharged 320 Skyknight was developed from the 310F. Equipped with TSIO-470-B engines and featuring an extra cabin window on each side, it was in production between 1961 and 1969 (the 320E was named the Executive Skyknight), when it was replaced by the similar Turbo 310.

The 310G was certified in 1961 and introduced the canted wingtip fuel tanks found on the majority of the Cessna twin-engine product line, marketed as "stabila-tip" tanks by Cessna, because they were meant to aid stability in flight. A single side window replaced the rear two windows on the 310K (certified in late 1965), with optional three-blade propellers being introduced as well. Subsequent developments included the 310Q and turbocharged T310Q with a redesigned rear cabin featuring a skylight window, and the final 310R and T310R, identifiable by a lengthened nose containing a baggage compartment. Production ended in 1980.

Over the years there were several modifications to the 310 to improve performance. Noted aircraft engineer Jack Riley produced two variants, The Riley Rocket 310 and the Riley Turbostream 310. Riley replaced the standard Continental  engines with  Lycoming TIO-540 engines. These turbocharged intercooled engines were installed with three-blade Hartzell propellers in a counter-rotating configuration to further increase performance and single-engine safety.

Operational history

Commercial applications
The Cessna 310 was a common charter aircraft for the many air taxi firms that sprang up in the general aviation boom that followed World War II. The advantages of the Cessna 310 over its contemporaries, such as the Piper PA-23, were its speed, operating costs and aftermarket modifications, such as the Robertson STOL kits that made it popular worldwide for its bush flying characteristics.

Military applications
In 1957, the United States Air Force (USAF) selected the Cessna 310 for service as a light utility aircraft for transport and administrative support. The USAF purchased 160 unmodified 310A aircraft with the designation L-27A and unofficially nicknamed Blue Canoe, later changed to U-3A in 1962. An additional 36 upgraded 310 designated L-27B (later U-3B) were delivered in 1960–61; these aircraft were essentially military 310Fs and as such equipped with the more powerful  engines and can be identified by their extra cabin windows, longer nose and swept vertical fin. A USAF study after one year of operational service found the U-3A had direct operating costs of less than $12 an hour. The U-3 saw active service in a support role when the USAF deployed aircraft to South Vietnam during the Vietnam War, where they were used on courier flights between air bases. Some USAF aircraft were later transferred to the U.S. Army and U.S. Navy and the type continued in United States military service into the mid-1970s.

Notable private flights
On December 19, 1992, Cuban defector Major Orestes Lorenzo Pérez returned to Cuba in a 1961 Cessna 310 to retrieve his wife and two sons.

Variants
310
310A
310B
310C
Unit cost $59,950 in 1959
310D
First model with swept vertical tail, other minor detail changes; 268 built for 1960 model year.
310E
310F
310G
310H
E310H
Version of 310H with the  maximum takeoff weight of the 310G; combined total of 148 310H and E310H built.
310I
First model with baggage compartments in rear of engine nacelles, Continental IO-470-U engines and minor detail changes; 200 built in 1964.
310J
310J-1
E310J
310K
310L
First model with increased fuel capacity via fuel tanks inside wings and optional fuel tanks in engine nacelles, also single-piece windshield, redesigned landing gear, and minor changes; 207 built in 1967.
310M
Revised designation for the 310E.
310N
Model produced in 1968, with revised instrument panel and provision for optional cargo door and fuel; 198 built.

Model produced in 1969, with Continental IO-470-VO engines, ventral fin and a shorter nose gear leg.

T310Q

Last production model, introduced in the 1975 model year, with  Continental IO-520-M or IO-520-MB engines; three-blade propellers as standard; lengthened nose containing a baggage compartment; and  maximum takeoff weight.
T310R
Version of 310R with turbocharged Continental TSIO-520-B or TSIO-520-BB engines; combined total of 1,332 310R and T310R built.
310S
Original designation for the Cessna 320.
320 Skyknight
Enlarged version of the 310F with six seats, larger cabin and two turbocharged engines; 110 built.
320A Skyknight
First model with canted fuel tanks and minor changes; 47 built.
320B Skyknight
First model with nacelle baggage lockers, minor changes; 62 built.
320C Skyknight
Model with a longer cabin, optional seventh seat and minor changes; 73 built.
320D Executive Skyknight
Model with reshaped rear windows and  TSIO-520-B engines; 130 built.
320E Executive Skyknight
Model with pointed nose, single piece windshield, modified landing gear, increased takeoff weight and minor changes; 110 built.
320F Executive Skyknight
Model with minor changes compared to 320E; 45 built.
L-27A
United States military designation for the 310A, later changed to U-3A.
L-27B
United States military designation for the 310E/310M, later changed to U-3B.
U-3A
L-27A redesignated in 1963.
U-3B
L-27B redesignated in 1963.
Colemill Executive 600
Conversion of models 310F to 310Q, replacing the engines with  Lycoming TIO-540-J2BDs driving four-bladed propellers.
Riley 65
Conversion offered for models 310 to 310G, replacing the engines with two 240-260 hp (179–194 kW) Continental O-470Ds or -470Ms.
 Riley Super 310
Conversion of Cessna 310/320 by fitting two 310 hp (231 kW) Continental TSIO-520J or 520N engines.
Riley Turbostream
Conversion of Cessna 310 by fitting two 350 hp Lycoming engines.
 Riley Rocket
Conversion of Cessna 310 by fitting two 290 hp (216 kW) Lycoming IO-540-A1A5 engines and more fuel capacity.
 Riley Turbo-Rocket
 Riley Rocket with each engine fitted with two Riley-manufactured turbochargers.

Operators

Civil
The aircraft is popular with air charter companies and small feeder airlines, and is operated by private individuals and companies.

Military operators
Countries known to have operated the U-3/310 include.

Argentina
Argentine Air Force — Cessna 310 and 320 models
Bolivia
Colombia
Colombian Air Force
Republic of the Congo
France
French Air Force — 12 operated
Haiti
Haiti Air Corps
Indonesia
Indonesian Air Force
Indonesian Army Aviation
Iran
Madagascar
Air Force of Madagascar — One 310R
Mexico
Mexican Naval Aviation
Paraguay
Paraguayan Air Force
Peru
Peruvian Navy
Philippines
Philippine Air Force
Saudi Arabia
Suriname
Suriname Air Force
Tanzania
Tanzanian Air Force
United States
United States Air Force received 196 L-27A and L-27B (later redesignated U-3A and B).
United States Army received 25 ex-US Air Force L-27As (later U-3As) and at least 13 L-27Bs (later U-3B) from 1960.
Uruguay
Uruguayan Air Force (One 310R)
Venezuela
Venezuelan Navy
Zaire
Zaire Air Force

Accidents and incidents
 On October 28, 1959, a Cessna 310 carrying Cuban revolutionary Camilo Cienfuegos disappeared over the Atlantic Ocean on a night flight from Camagüey to Havana. Neither the aircraft nor the body of Cienfuegos were ever found.
 On November 26, 1962, a Saab Scandia 90A-1 (registration PP-SRA) of VASP on a scheduled domestic service in Brazil from São Paulo-Congonhas to Rio de Janeiro-Santos Dumont collided in the air over the Municipality of Paraibuna, State of São Paulo with a private Cessna 310 registration PT-BRQ en route from Rio de Janeiro-Santos Dumont to São Paulo-Campo de Marte. Both were flying on the same airway in opposite directions and failed to have visual contact. The two aircraft crashed killing all 23 passengers and crew of the Saab and the four occupants of the Cessna.
 On July 19, 1967, a Boeing 727 operating as Piedmont Airlines Flight 22 collided with a Cessna 310 near Hendersonville, North Carolina in the US, killing all 79 people on board the Boeing 727 and the three people in the Cessna.
 On October 16, 1972, US Congressmen Nick Begich of Alaska, and Hale Boggs of Louisiana, disappeared over Alaska while flying in a 310C during a campaign trip.
On September 11, 1981, the Swing Auditorium in San Bernardino, California was irreparably damaged when it was struck by a twin-engine Cessna T310P, following which the building had to be razed.
 On June 29, 1989, concert organist Keith Chapman and his wife were killed when their 310Q piloted by Chapman crashed into the Sangre de Cristo Mountains of the Colorado Rockies while they were returning from a performance in California. 

, the US National Transportation Safety Board has recorded 1,787 incidents for Cessna 310s since 12 January 1964. Of these, 436 were fatal.

Specifications (1956 model 310)

Notable appearances in media

See also

References

 FAA Type Certificate Data Sheet Number 3A10 
Andrade, John. Militair 1982. London: Aviation Press Limited, 1982. 
 Bridgman, Leonard. Jane's All The World's Aircraft 1956–57. New York: The McGraw-Hill Book Company, Inc., 1956.
 
 Harding, Stephen. U.S. Army Aircraft Since 1947. Shrewsbury, UK: Airlife Publishing, 1990. .
 
 Michell, Simon. Jane's Civil and Military Aircraft Upgrades 1994–95. Coulsdon, UK: Jane's Information Group, 1994. .
 Taylor, John W. R. Jane's All The World's Aircraft 1966–67. London: Sampson Low, Marston & Company, 1966.
 Taylor, John W. R. Jane's All The World's Aircraft 1967–68. London: Sampson Low, Marston & Company, 1967.
 Taylor, John W. R. Jane's All The World's Aircraft 1968–69. London: Sampson Low, Marston & Company, 1968.
 Taylor, John W. R. Jane's All The World's Aircraft 1969–70. London: Sampson Low, Marston & Company, 1969.
 Taylor, John W. R. Jane's All The World's Aircraft 1982–83. London: Jane's Yearbooks, 1982. .

External links

 U-3 description at GlobalSecurity.org

310
1950s United States civil utility aircraft
Low-wing aircraft
Aircraft first flown in 1953
Twin piston-engined tractor aircraft
Aircraft with counter-rotating propellers